Olzhas Sattibayev (born 2 May 1988) is a Kazakhstani boxer. He competed in the men's flyweight event at the 2016 Summer Olympics.

References

External links
 

1988 births
Living people
Kazakhstani male boxers
Olympic boxers of Kazakhstan
Boxers at the 2016 Summer Olympics
Place of birth missing (living people)
Flyweight boxers
21st-century Kazakhstani people